Jupiter Artland is a contemporary sculpture park and art gallery outside the city of Edinburgh, Scotland. Jupiter Artland Foundation is a registered charity that is supported by classes, workshops, events, ticket sales, and donations.
It is open to general visits between May and September.

The grounds of the house have been developed as the sculpture park and two new wings designed by Benjamin Tindall Architects were completed in 2015 to provide indoor gallery space.
The sculpture collection was established in 1999 by art collectors Robert and Nicky Wilson and "focuses on nurturing the work of contemporary artists and commissioning site-specific work for its 120 acres of woodland and meadow."

In April 2016, Jupiter Artland was shortlisted for the 2016 Museum of the Year award.

In 2018, it was a filming location for BBC Four's "Magic Numbers: Hannah Fry's Mysterious World of Maths", presented by mathematician Hannah Fry.

Collection

Among the permanently installed sculptures are works by Tania Kovats, Andy Goldsworthy, Anish Kapoor, Antony Gormley, Anya Gallaccio, Christian Boltanski, Cornelia Parker, Ian Hamilton Finlay, Jim Lambie, Laura Ford, Mark Quinn, Nathan Coley, Pablo Bronstein, and Phyllida Barlow.

See also
 Little Sparta
 List of sculpture parks
 Sculpture in Scotland

References

External links
 
 

Outdoor sculptures in Scotland
Sculpture gardens, trails and parks in the United Kingdom
Land art
Charities based in Edinburgh
Art museums and galleries in Edinburgh
Scottish gardens in the English Landscape Garden style